is a Japanese visual novel studio known for the production of adult bishōjo games. Its main office is located in Taitō, Tokyo. The representative producer and president is Ryūichirō Yamakawa. “Frontwing” is the company's main brand, but it has also released games under affiliated brands “Survive” (サヴァイブ), “Hotchkiss” (ホチキス), and “b-wing.” These brands have all since merged to become “Frontwing.”

Frontwing's games cover a diverse range of genres, from school love life stories to hardcore adult games, and also games that utilize 3D computer graphics. The 3D content production team, Polygon Mura (ポリゴン村), is closely involved in the games’ production by seeking ways to incorporate 3D graphics into essentially 2D projects. Several of their games, originally produced for PC, have been ported to consoles. The development of the ported versions is generally done in-house. The company is also active in many other fields, including the development of the dance 3D software Dance X Mixer, taking part in the bi-annual Comic Market, and Niconico live broadcasts.

Since the company's founding in 1999 as a bishōjo games developer and the release of Frontwing's first title, Canary (Canaria: Kono Omoi o Uta ni Nosete) in August 2000, it has published over 20 titles in the visual novel genre. The studio's flagship games include the Netherworld Angel Djibril series, and the Grisaia trilogy which spawned an animated series in 2015.  In regards to the Djibril series, writer Naoki Miyamoto, author of the book "Adult Games: Introduction to Cultural Studies”, has pointed out why there is a big demand for such works: “If the one to fight is a beautiful heroine, the risks she takes stimulate people's erotic imagination.”

In 2011, the first installment of the Grisaia series, The Fruit of Grisaia, won first place in the Moe Game Award. The second installment, The Labyrinth of Grisaia, won second place in 2012.

Frontwing marked its first venture into the overseas market May 29, 2015, with the English release of The Fruit of Grisaia on Steam. The company has since established its own in-house translation team, which made its debut with the English release of The Leisure of Grisaia on May 18, 2016.

On March 16, 2021, Frontwing announced that Bushiroad had acquired a 50.625% controlling stake of the company, with Frontwing becoming a subsidiary of Bushiroad.

List of visual novels 
Listed by brand, in chronological order.

Frontwing

Survive

Hotchkiss

b-wing

Incidents
 Green Green Case

References

External links 
  
  (English)

Frontwing Official English Facebook page

Amusement companies of Japan
Bushiroad
Hentai companies
Video game companies of Japan
Video game development companies
Video game companies established in 2000
Japanese companies established in 2000